Guild Wars 2: End of Dragons is the third expansion pack for Guild Wars 2, a massively multiplayer online role-playing game developed by ArenaNet and published by NCSoft. It was released on Microsoft Windows on February 28, 2022, and was made available for pre-purchase on July 26, 2021.

The expansion introduces new features such as the game's first multiplayer mount: the siege turtle, a fully fledged fishing system, and a 'Jade Bot' companion, that can give the player access to additional perks. The expansion also gives players access to the southern continent of Cantha (first seen in the first game's Guild Wars Factions expansion). It also introduced four new strike missions (raid style encounters), with challenge modes.

Storyline 
After the events of 'The Icebrood Saga', Path of Fire's second season of Living world content, the dragon cycle that has sustained and blighted Tyria for ages is collapsing. Over two centuries ago, the Empire of the Dragon severed all bonds with central Tyria and Elona. Cantha has its own history of turmoil and triumph, reflected in ancient landmarks, enduring artistry, and modern life. The Jade Wind petrified everything it touched, devastating the southeastern coastal regions. A stone sea holds no food—but it's absorbed centuries of magic. Canthan innovators have long sought practical applications for the material now known as “dragonjade”, achieving solutions undreamed of elsewhere in the world. New innovations are on the horizon.

Reception 

It has a score of 83/100 on Metacritic. GameSpace said "A marvelous new frontier for Guild Wars 2. End of Dragons crashes into Cantha and expands Tyria with more than just a new sandbox. It delivers an astounding new adventure on a stupendous scale."

References

External links 
 

2022 video games
Fantasy massively multiplayer online role-playing games
Guild Wars
MacOS games
Massively multiplayer online role-playing games
NCSoft games
Video game expansion packs
Video games developed in the United States
Video games scored by Wilbert Roget, II
Windows games
Video games scored by Lena Raine